Contactless smartcards are being progressively introduced as an alternative option to paper ticketing on the National Rail system of Great Britain. Tickets for use on National Rail services can be loaded onto any ITSO card.

The ITSO standard has been developed to cover all types of public transport. It has been included as a requirement by the Department for Transport for all new rail franchises in the last few years. It is also the format that ENCTS concessionary passes and rail staff passes are issued in.

Three train operating companies have launched pay-as-you-go systems where fares are automatically deducted by touching-in-and-out at the start and end of the journey. Branded as keyGo on Govia Thameslink Railway (GTR) and Tap2Go on South Western Railway (SWR), they require use of GTR's The Key and SWR's Touch smartcard respectively. Great Western Railway (GWR) also launched a pay-as-you-go system called GWR Touch in August 2022, which required the use of GWR’s Touch smartcard.

The first large scale adoption of smartcards for transport in Great Britain was by Transport for London (TfL) with the Oyster card. It was initially only available on TfL services, but it has been progressively rolled out to National Rail services in and around Greater London. ITSO cards can also now be used on Oyster card readers.

, support for smartcards is as follows:

See also
 Oyster card (pay as you go) on National Rail
 Smartcards on buses and trams in Great Britain

Notes

External links
Smart Tickets on National Rail – National Rail
Smart Ticketing Operators and Retailers – National Rail
National Rail Smartcard Manager – Apple App Store
National Rail Smartcard Manager – Google Play

Fare collection systems in the United Kingdom
National Rail